Jesus Gonzalo Barrera y Alimurung (December 18, 1896 – August 28, 1988) was a member of the Supreme Court of the Philippines from 1959 to 1966.

He was born in Concepcion, Tarlac. His father, Marciano Barrera, served as the first appointive Governor of Tarlac province under the U.S. government.

Barrera received his law degree from the University of the Philippines in 1921 and then entered private law practice. He later received a master of law degree from the University of Santo Tomas. He was first appointed a judge in 1938. During the Japanese occupation, he headed the Civil Liberties Union of the Philippines, an underground movement of prominent former officials who furnished military information to guerillas to be passed on to Gen. Douglas Macarthur in Australia. In the late 1940s Barrera was a key figure who attempted to convince President Manuel Roxas to negotiate a peace with the Huk guerillas who had rebelled because the United States and Philippine governments refused to recognize their wartime activities vs the Japanese enemy.

In 1956, while serving as Undersecretary of the Department of Justice in the Philippines, Barrera stated that the situation with regard to U.S. military personnel off-base, where they were generally tried by Philippine authorities when accused of a crime was workable, but that the situation on the U.S. military bases where actions were not under Philippine criminal jurisdiction needed to change. He was the chair of the subcommittee negotiating the issue of jurisdiction during the 1956 U.S./Philippine talks trying to renegotiate the status of the U.S. military areas in the Philippines. Barrera was also the Secretary of Justice for the Philippines in 1958.

In 1971 Barrera was a member of the Philippines Constitutional Convention and a contender for the presidency of the convention.
He was one of 19 convention delegates who refused to sign the Marcos-influenced 1972 Constitution which granted Marcos autocratic powers.

References

1896 births
Associate Justices of the Supreme Court of the Philippines
University of the Philippines alumni
University of Santo Tomas alumni
1988 deaths
People from Tarlac
Secretaries of Justice of the Philippines
Garcia administration cabinet members